= Mariam Orachelasjvili =

Soviet-Georgian politician (1887–1937)

Mariam Orachelasjvili (1887–1937) was a Soviet-Georgian Politician (Communist).

She served as Minister of Education from 1936 to 1937.
